Xili station is a Metro station of Shenzhen Metro Line 5 and Line 7. Line 5 platforms opened on 22 June 2011 and Line 7 platforms opened on 28 October 2016. This station is an underground station.

Station layout

Exits

References

External links
 Shenzhen Metro Xili Station (Line 5) (Chinese)
 Shenzhen Metro Xili Station (Line 5 (English)
 Shenzhen Metro Xili Station (Line 7) (Chinese)
 Shenzhen Metro Xili Station (Line 7 (English)

Shenzhen Metro stations
Railway stations in Guangdong
Nanshan District, Shenzhen
Railway stations in China opened in 2011